Belagur  is a village in the southern state of Karnataka, India. It is located in the Hosadurga taluk of Chitradurga district in Karnataka.

Temples
The main deity of this place is Lord Hanuman called "Veera Prathapa Anjaneya". It is believed to have been installed by Sage Vyasaraya about 750 years ago.

Demographics
As of 2001 India census, Belagur had a population of 6071 with 3042 males and 3029 females.

See also
 Chitradurga
 Districts of Karnataka

References

External links
 http://Chitradurga.nic.in/
http://belaguru.org/

Villages in Chitradurga district